Garret Pettis (born August 31, 1989) is a retired American soccer player who recently played for Harrisburg City Islanders in the USL Professional Division.

External links
 Lipscomb University bio 

1989 births
Living people
American soccer players
Lipscomb Bisons men's soccer players
Penn FC players
USL Championship players
Soccer players from Pennsylvania
People from Elizabethtown, Pennsylvania
Association football forwards